Auke Adema (4 October 1907 – 31 March 1976) was a Dutch skater. He won the Elfstedentocht, the world's largest speed skating competition twice. In the sixth race in 1940 he controversially shared the victory with Durk van der Duim, Cor Jongert, Piet Keijzer and Sjouke Westra.  In Dokkum they had made a conspiracy to cross the finish line together. This became known as the Pact of Dokkum. The practice of non competitive finishing was outlawed after this. Adema won the seventh Elfstedentocht by himself on 6 February 1941 in a time of 9 hours 19 minutes, a race record.  In the race he broke away from the pack with two others to have an early lead.  However, when stopping to eat a sausage with Joop Bosman at Workum, other skaters managed to get ahead, but Adema overtook and won by three minutes over Bosman.

References

External links
film of the 1941 race
Elfstedentocht 1941 (Harlingen)
Geschiedenis24 Image

1907 births
1976 deaths
Dutch male speed skaters
Sportspeople from Friesland
People from Franekeradeel
20th-century Dutch people